Belgium was represented by Jacques Raymond and Lily Castel, with the song "Goeiemorgen, morgen", at the 1971 Eurovision Song Contest, which took place on 3 April in Dublin. Raymond and Castel had not taken part in the original Belgian final, which was won with Nicole and Hugo performing the song.

Before Eurovision

Eurosong 
25 songs were submitted for the Belgian preselection, and throughout nine semi-finals were whittled down to 12. The exact means by which the qualifying songs were chosen is unclear and appears to have been rather complicated, consisting of matches and re-matches.

The final took place on 6 February 1971 at the Amerikaans Theater in Brussels. Eight acts were involved, as Marah and Mary Porcelijn had qualified with three songs each. Voting was by an "expert" jury of 12 members, each nominating their favorite song. This turned out to be something of a non-event, as in the end, only three songs received any votes at all. "Goeiemorgen, morgen" was the choice of eight of the jury members.

Future Belgian representatives Ann Christy (1975) and Micha Marah (1979) took part in the 1971 preselection.

At Eurovision 
Shortly before the Dublin final however, Nicole had fallen ill and was unable to travel, so broadcaster BRT (Belgische Radio- en Televisieomroep, Nederlandse uitzendingen), the predecessor of VRT, drafted in Raymond and Castel as late replacements. Raymond had previously sung for Belgium at Eurovision in 1963. Nicole and Hugo would represent Belgium in 1973.

On the night of the final Raymond and Castel performed 10th in the running order, following the United Kingdom and preceding Italy. At the close of the voting "Goeiemorgen, morgen" had received 68 points, placing Belgium 14th of the 18 participating countries. The original version by Nicole and Hugo does, however, remain one of the better-remembered of Belgian Eurovision entries.

Voting

References 

1971
Countries in the Eurovision Song Contest 1971
Eurovision